Václav Houdek (5 September 1906 – 2 April 1957) was a Slovak architect. His work was part of the architecture event in the art competition at the 1936 Summer Olympics.

References

1906 births
1957 deaths
Slovak architects
Olympic competitors in art competitions
People from Blovice